Transmembrane 9 superfamily member 2 is a protein that in humans is encoded by the TM9SF2 gene.

References

Further reading